The Lost World is a science fiction novel by British writer Sir Arthur Conan Doyle, published by Hodder & Stoughton in 1912, concerning an expedition to a plateau in the Amazon basin of South America where prehistoric animals still survive. It was originally published serially in the Strand Magazine and illustrated by New-Zealand-born artist Harry Rountree during the months of April–November 1912.  The character of Professor Challenger was introduced in this book. The novel also describes a war between indigenous people and a vicious tribe of ape-like creatures.

Plot summary 

Edward Malone, a young reporter for the Daily Gazette, asks his editor for a dangerous assignment to impress the woman he loves, Gladys, who wishes for a great man capable of brave deeds and actions. His task is to approach the notorious Professor Challenger, who dislikes the popular press intensely and physically assaults intrusive journalists. The subject is to be his recent South American expedition which, surrounded by controversy, guarantees a hostile reaction. As a direct approach would be instantly rebuffed, Malone instead masquerades as an earnest student. On meeting the professor he is startled by his intimidating physique, but believes his ruse is succeeding. Seeing through the masquerade, then confirming Malone's scientific knowledge is non-existent, Challenger erupts in anger and forcibly throws him out. Malone earns his respect by refusing to press charges with a policeman who saw his violent ejection into the street. Challenger ushers him back inside and, extracting promises of confidentiality, eventually reveals he has discovered living dinosaurs in South America, following up an expedition by a now-deceased previous American explorer named Maple White. At a tumultuous public meeting in which Challenger experiences further ridicule (most notably from a professional rival, Professor Summerlee), Malone volunteers for an expedition to verify the discoveries. His companions are to be Professor Summerlee, and Lord John Roxton, an adventurer who helped end slavery on the Amazon; the notches on his rifle showing how many slavers he killed doing so.

Running the gauntlet of hostile tribes, the expedition finally reaches the lost world with the aid of Indian guides, who are superstitiously scared of the area. Summerlee retains his scepticism, despite being delighted at making other scientific discoveries in the fields of botany and entomology: even a glimpse of a pterodactyl at a distance fails to convince him, because he believes it is some species of stork. The sharper-eyed Roxton is inclined to agree it is not a stork but has no clue what it really is, until a night-time encounter when it flies down and is seen by all at close range, as it steals the companions' dinner. After this, Summerlee apologises to Challenger. The cliffs to the plateau itself prove to be apparently unscalable, but an adjacent pinnacle turns out to be climbable, and moreover, has a tall tree which can be cut down and used as a bridge, which allows the four explorers to cross to the plateau. However, they are almost immediately trapped on it, thanks to the treachery of one of their luggage-porters, Gomez: who, as it turns out, is a former slaver whose brother had previously been killed by Roxton during his anti-slavery activities. Gomez takes his revenge by dropping the tree off the cliff, stranding the explorers on the plateau. Roxton shoots Gomez and they hear the scream and then the thud of the falling body. The other half-breed is subsequently killed by another porter, a black ex-slave named Zambo, who remains loyal to the party: but the latter is unable to do much more to help, other than send some of the company's supplies over by rope.

Whilst investigating the wonders of the lost world, discovering many plants and creatures thought to be extinct, they narrowly escape an attack from pterodactyls. Although barely escaping with their lives, Roxton takes great interest in nearby blue clay deposits. At night a ferocious carnivorous dinosaur is about to break through the thorn bushes surrounding their camp; Roxton averts disaster by bravely dashing at it, thrusting a blazing torch at its face to scare it away. Later, all except Malone are captured by a race of ape-men. Whilst in captivity they discover that a tribe of natives, with whom the ape-men are at war, inhabit the other side of the plateau. Roxton escapes and together with Malone mounts a rescue, preventing many unpleasant deaths, including a young native who is a prince of his tribe. The rescued natives take the party to their village, then with the help of their firepower return to defeat the ape-men. After witnessing the power of their guns, the tribe wish to keep them on the plateau but, helped by the young prince they saved, they eventually discover a tunnel leading back to the outside world. During their time with the tribe, Roxton plans how to capture a pterodactyl chick, and succeeds in doing so.

Upon return to England, despite full reports from Malone many detractors continue to dismiss the expedition's account, much as they had Challenger's original story – although Summerlee, having been on the expedition, has now switched sides and is supporting Challenger. Anticipating this, at a public meeting at Queen's Hall Challenger produces the young pterodactyl as proof, transfixing the audience and leaving them in no doubt of the truth. The explorers are instantly feted as heroes, and on a wave of adulation find themselves carried shoulder-high from the hall by cheering crowds. The pterodactyl, in the confusion, makes its escape and is witnessed several times at different locations around London, causing consternation wherever it goes, but is last seen heading off to the southwest in the probable direction of its home.

At a private celebratory dinner, Roxton reveals to the others that the blue clay contained diamonds. He had been tipped off to the possibility, by the recollection of a similar feature in South Africa, and managed to extract about £200,000 worth (£23 million in 2021), which is to be split between them. Challenger plans to open a private museum with his share. Summerlee plans to retire and categorise fossils. Malone returns to his love, Gladys, hoping she will recognise his achievements. Instead, he finds she has now changed her mind and married a very ordinary man instead, an insignificant clerk. Astonished at this turn of events, and with nothing to keep him in London, he decides to accompany Roxton back to the lost world.

Characters
Professor George Edward Challenger, a zoologist
Edward D. Malone, a reporter
McArdle, Malone's editor at the Daily Gazette
Professor Summerlee, a scientist
Lord John Roxton, an adventurer
Gomez, brother to an enslaver whom Roxton killed
Manuel, Gomez's friend
Zambo, South American friend to the traveler
Gladys Hungerton, Edward Malone's love interest
Jessie Challenger, Challenger's wife
Maple White, a deceased explorer who discovered the lost world
The Accala Indians, the natives of the lost world

References in other works

In addition to lending its title to this subgenre, the title of Doyle's work was reused by Michael Crichton in his 1995 novel The Lost World, a sequel to Jurassic Park, and its film adaptation, The Lost World: Jurassic Park. Two of the characters in Crichton's novel mention a palaeontologist called John Roxton.

References to actual history, geography and current science
 
The characters of Ed Malone and Lord John Roxton were modelled, respectively, on the journalist E. D. Morel and the diplomat Roger Casement, leaders of the Congo Free State reform campaign (the Congo Reform Association), which Doyle supported. In 1911, just when Doyle was writing the book, Casement made a second such anti-slavery reform campaign in the Amazonian part of Peru.

Doyle was aware of his good friend Percy Harrison Fawcett's expedition to the Huanchaca Plateau in Noel Kempff Mercado National Park, Bolivia. Fawcett organised several expeditions to delimit the border between Bolivia and Brazil – an area of potential conflict between both countries. Doyle attended Fawcett's lecture to the Royal Geographical Society on 13 February 1911 and was impressed by the tale about the remote "province of Caupolican" (present day Huanchaca Plateau) in Bolivia – a dangerous area with impenetrable forests, where Fawcett saw "monstrous tracks of unknown origin".

Fawcett wrote in his posthumously published memoirs: "Monsters from the dawn of Man's existence might still roam these heights unchallenged, imprisoned and protected by unscalable cliffs. So thought Conan Doyle when later in London I spoke of these hills and showed photographs of them.  He mentioned an idea for a novel on Central South America and asked for information, which I told him I should be glad to supply.  The fruit of it was his Lost World in 1912, appearing as a serial in the Strand Magazine, and subsequently in the form of a book that achieved widespread popularity." A 1996 Science Fiction Studies review of an annotated edition of the novel suggested that another inspiration for the story may have been the 1890s contested political history of the Pacaraima Mountains plateaux, and Mount Roraima in particular.

Film, television and radio adaptations

Film
Theatrical Films:
The Lost World (1925; film)
The Lost World (1960; film)
Direct-to-Video films:
The Lost World (1992; film)
Return to the Lost World (1992; sequel film)
The Lost World (1998; film)
 Dinosaur Island (2002)
King of the Lost World (2005)

Television
Sir Arthur Conan Doyle's The Lost World (1999–2002; TV series)
The Lost World (2002) (Canadian-French animated series)
The Lost World (2001; television film)

Documentary
The Real Lost World (2006)

Audio
The Lost World (1944; radio)
John Dickson Carr as Narrator (all characters)
The Lost World (1949; BBC Light Programme radio serial)
With Abraham Sofaer, Ivor Barnard, Lewis Stringer, Cyril Gardiner
Dinosaurs! (1966, an audio dramatic version of The Lost World adapted and directed by Ronald Liss and recorded by permission of the Estate of Sir Arthur Conan Doyle; MGM/Leo the Lion Records C/CH-1016)
 Basil Rathbone as Professor Challenger
 Leo Marion as Dr. Summerlee
 Peter Fernandez as Edward Malone
(The character of Lord John Roxton was not included in this adaptation.)
The Lost World (1975 BBC Radio 4 Classic Serial)
Francis de Wolff as Professor Challenger
Gerald Harper as Lord John Roxton
Kevin McHugh as Edward Malone
Carleton Hobbs as Professor Summerlee
The Lost World (2011; BBC Radio 4 Classic Serial)
David Robb as Professor Challenger
Jamie Glover as Lord John Roxton
Jonathan Forbes as Edward Malone
Jasmine Hyde as Dr. Diana Summerlee (a female substitute for Professor Summerlee in the original novel)
Jane Whittenshaw as Edith Challenger
Nyasha Hatendi as Maple White
Vinicius Salles as Querioz

See also
 Lost world
 1912 in science fiction
 Up (2009 film)

References

External links

 
 .
 The Lost World (1925) available for free download from Internet Archive.
 

1912 British novels
1912 science fiction novels
Novels about dinosaurs
Living dinosaurs in fiction
British science fiction novels
Lost world novels
British novels adapted into films
Professor Challenger novels
Novels set in South America
Novels set in Bolivia
Works originally published in The Strand Magazine
Novels first published in serial form
Hodder & Stoughton books